The Butts Creek Point Fire Lookout, in Idaho County, Idaho, was listed on the National Register of Historic Places in 2018.

According to the Challis newspaper, it is located "at 7,836 feet elevation on a prominent knob surrounded by a forest of mixed lodgepole pine and fir with an understory of native grasses rooted in decomposed granite soils, forest Public Affairs Officer Amy Baumer said."  "The lookout has four glass walls that provide a 360-degree view of some of the most remote landscapes in the lower 48. People can see the Clearwater Mountains, the Bitterroot Mountains, the Bighorn Crags and the Salmon River Mountains from the lookout."

The tower was built from a kit taken to the site by a 10 mule string, and has a  cab.  It was in service from 1933 to 1982.

References

Fire lookout towers on the National Register of Historic Places in Idaho
National Register of Historic Places in Idaho County, Idaho
Buildings and structures completed in 1933